Daniel Gerard Devine (born 7 September 1992) is an Irish professional footballer who plays as a centre-back for Scottish club Inverness Caledonian Thistle. 

Devine has previously played for Linfield, Preston North End, Fleetwood Town, Wrexham, Partick Thistle and Dunfermline Athletic.

Career

Club career
Born in Belfast, Devine played youth football with Lisburn Youth FC, Lisburn Distillery and Linfield. He made one senior appearance for Linfield in an Irish League Cup game against Portadown on 17 December 2008  before moving to Preston North End in July 2009. He made his professional debut for Preston on 30 April 2011 in a 2–1 defeat against Ipswich Town. In June 2011, Devine signed a one-year contract with Preston. In May 2012, Devine was released from the club after being told his contract would not be renewed.

He joined Fleetwood Town in the summer of 2012, moving on loan to Wrexham in September 2012. Wrexham offered Devine a permanent long term contract, but he chose to join Scottish Premier League side Inverness Caledonian Thistle, citing his desire to work with manager Terry Butcher. After Butcher turned down the chance to join Barnsley, Devine said he was relieved that Butcher chose to stay, as Butcher was one of the reasons why he turned down clubs in England.

In March 2013, Devine signed a contract extension, keeping him at the club until the end of the 2014–15 season. A suspension to Gary Warren meant that Devine played for Inverness in their 2015 Scottish Cup Final victory. Soon afterwards, Devine signed a new one-year contract with the club.

Devine left Inverness in 2016 and was then signed by Partick Thistle on a two-year contract. Thistle were relegated via the playoffs at the end of the 2017–18 season. Following that relegation, Devine was one of many players released by Thistle.

Devine then signed with Scottish Championship club Dunfermline Athletic. Devine was released after two seasons with Dunfermline, and subsequently re-signed for fellow Championship side Inverness Caledonian Thistle in August 2020 on a two-year deal.

International career
Devine represented Northern Ireland at youth international level. In May 2011 the BBC reported that then Northern Ireland manager Nigel Worthington had been informed by Devine that he intended to switch his allegiance to the Republic of Ireland. In March 2018, the then Northern Ireland manager Michael O'Neill said that he would have selected Devine in his Northern Ireland squad for UEFA Euro 2016, but was unable to do so because Devine had signed an international transfer form which committed him to the Republic.

Career statistics

Honours
Inverness Caledonian Thistle
Scottish Cup: 2014–15

References

External links

1992 births
Living people
Association footballers from Northern Ireland
Republic of Ireland association footballers
Lisburn Distillery F.C. players
Linfield F.C. players
Preston North End F.C. players
Fleetwood Town F.C. players
Wrexham A.F.C. players
English Football League players
Inverness Caledonian Thistle F.C. players
Scottish Premier League players
Scottish Professional Football League players
Northern Ireland under-21 international footballers
Partick Thistle F.C. players
Dunfermline Athletic F.C. players
Association football central defenders